Ramal is a village and municipality in the Ujar Rayon of Azerbaijan.  It has a population of 778.

References 

Populated places in Ujar District